The 2002–03 Mississippi State basketball team represented Mississippi State University as a member of the Southeastern Conference during the 2002–03 college basketball season. Under fifth-year head coach Rick Stansbury, the team played their home games at Humphrey Coliseum in Starkville, Mississippi. Mississippi State won the SEC West Division regular season title. The Bulldogs reached the championship game of the SEC tournament, losing to Kentucky. The team received an at-large bid to the NCAA tournament as No. 5 seed in the East region. The Bulldogs were upset by No. 12 seed Butler in the opening round, 47–46.
Mississippi State finished the season with a record of 21–10 (9–7 SEC).

Roster

Schedule and results 

|-
!colspan=9 style=| Non-conference Regular season

|-
!colspan=9 style=| SEC Regular season

|-
!colspan=9 style=| SEC Tournament

|-
!colspan=9 style=| NCAA Tournament

Rankings

References 

Mississippi State
Mississippi State Bulldogs men's basketball seasons
Mississippi State
Bull
Bull